Mouna Traoré (born May 4, 1995) is a Canadian actress and filmmaker. She is known for her performances in a variety of television series, such as Global TV's Rookie Blue (2012), CBC's Murdoch Mysteries (2015–2018), and Netflix's The Umbrella Academy (2020). Her film work includes the 2017 films The Drop In, which premiered at the Toronto International Film Festival, and Brown Girl Begins, directed by Sharon Lewis.

Early life
Traore was born and raised in Toronto, Canada. Her mother is from Haiti and her father is from Mali.

Career

Traoré began acting at a young age. She attended classes at the Young People's Theatre. She later graduated from the Etobicoke School of the Arts, and completed a Bachelor of Arts and Science at the University of Toronto.

In 2017, Traoré starred in the short film The Drop In, which premiered at the Toronto International Film Festival. She leads the film as Joelle, a hairdresser at a Black Canadian hair salon who faces an unexpected challenge when Grace (Oluniké Adeliyi), a woman she knew in her prior life, drops in ostensibly for a haircut, but in fact with ulterior motives involving Joelle's immigration status. The film was named to TIFF's annual year-end Canada's Top Ten list for short films in December 2017. Also that year, she starred in the Afro-futurist feature film Brown Girl Begins, opposite Emmanuel Kabongo. The film was released theatrically in 2018 and screened at several film festivals.

Traoré has featured in more than a dozen television series, beginning with a recurring role in the Teletoon children's comedy series, Majority Rules!. Her notable television roles include Crystal Markes on Global TV's Rookie Blue(2012), and Rebecca James on CBC's long-running detective series Murdoch Mysteries (2015–2018). She auditioned several times for a part on Murdoch Mysteries, before finally landing a recurring role on the series.

In 2020, she starred in the Netflix series Self Made as Esther, and The Umbrella Academy as Jill.

Other work 
Traoré is the co-founder of a production company, The Mini Films, through which she has written and produced two short films. Her 2015 short film, Adorn, won the award for Best Narrative Short at the Montreal International Black Film Festival.

Filmography

Film

Television

Production

Accolades

References

External links
 

Living people
Actresses from Toronto
Canadian film actresses
Canadian television actresses
Film producers from Ontario
Canadian women screenwriters
Film directors from Toronto
Writers from Toronto
Canadian women film producers
Black Canadian actresses
Canadian women film directors
Canadian people of Malian descent
Canadian people of Haitian descent
Actresses of Haitian descent
+Actresses
1995 births